Family trees of the kings of Gwynedd, Deheubarth and Powys and some of their more prominent relatives and heirs. The early generations of these genealogies are traditional and their historical accuracy is debated by scholars.

Wales, monarchs of
Wales